ZIL is a station on the Moscow Central Circle of the Moscow Metro that opened in September 2016. The station is named for ZiL a former automobile manufacturer that operated on the site until 2012.

External links 
 mkzd.ru

Moscow Metro stations
Railway stations in Russia opened in 2016
Moscow Central Circle stations